Manuel Nicoletti (born 9 December 1998) is an Italian footballer who plays for  club Reggiana on loan from Crotone as a left back or left midfielder.

Career 
Nicoletti is a youth exponent from Crotone. He made his Serie B debut on 29 November 2014 against Modena. He replaced Bruno Martella after 90 minutes.

He signed with Catanzaro on permanent basis on 20 July 2018 after spending the 2017–18 season on loan with the club.

On 21 September 2020, he joined Monopoli on a two-year contract.

On 3 August 2021, he signed a two-year contract for Foggia.

On 31 January 2022, Nicoletti signed a contract with Crotone until 30 June 2024. On 31 August 2022, he moved on loan to Reggiana, with an option to buy.

References

1998 births
People from Catanzaro
Footballers from Calabria
Living people
Italian footballers
Association football defenders
Italy youth international footballers
F.C. Crotone players
U.S. Catanzaro 1929 players
S.S. Monopoli 1966 players
Calcio Foggia 1920 players
A.C. Reggiana 1919 players
Serie B players
Serie C players
Sportspeople from the Province of Catanzaro